Dzmitry Yawhenavich Likhtarovich (born 1 March 1978 in Mogilev) is a retired Belarusian footballer (midfielder). He most recently played for BATE Borisov, which he regularly captained.

Career
As of 3 November 2012, he has appeared in 600 matches while being a member of Belarusian Premier League, Cup and national team squads. On 23 July 2013, he was played in a UEFA Champions League qualifying match against Kazakh side Shakhter Karagandy and became the footballer with the most appearances in the "Sergey Aleynikov" club, with 613 games under his bag, surpassing fellow Belarusian Sergey Gurenko.

Honours
Dnepr-Transmash Mogilev
Belarusian Premier League champion: 1998

BATE Borisov
Belarusian Premier League champion: 2002, 2006, 2007, 2008, 2009, 2010, 2011, 2012, 2013, 2014, 2015
Belarusian Cup winner: 2005–06, 2009–10, 2014–15
Belarusian Super Cup winner: 2010, 2011, 2013, 2014, 2015

References

External links
 Player profile on official FC BATE website
 
 

1978 births
Living people
People from Mogilev
Belarusian footballers
Association football midfielders
Belarus international footballers
FC BATE Borisov players
FC Dnepr Mogilev players
Sportspeople from Mogilev Region